The I UNTAET Transitional Government was the first administration or cabinet of United Nations Administered East Timor, a United Nations protectorate that provided an interim civil administration and a peacekeeping mission in the territory of East Timor from 25 October 1999 until 20 May 2002.

The Transitional Government took office on 15 July 2000 and was headed by the UN Transitional Administrator, Sérgio Vieira de Mello. It was replaced on 20 September 2001 by the II UNTAET Transitional Government.

Composition
The government was made up of the UN Transitional Administrator and Ministers, as follows:

References

Cabinets established in 2000
Cabinets disestablished in 2001
Government of East Timor
2000 establishments in East Timor
2001 disestablishments in East Timor